Siavash Teimouri (Persian:سیاوش تیموری) (born 22 June 1937) is an Iranian architect, artist and scholar. Born in Tehran, Iran, he graduated from the College of Fine Arts, University of Tehran with the highest mark under the supervision of Hooshang Seyhoun. He was then granted a scholarship to pursue his education in France in 1962, where he studied at École nationale supérieure des Beaux-Arts and graduated with a Diploma of Architecture (DPLG) in 1969 under the supervision of Le Corbusier. He worked with world-class architects of his time and received the French Association Architects' Prize in 1967. He is a member of the French Society of Architects and the board of trustees of Iran's Architects' Association. 

During his time in France, he worked as draftsman and architect with renowned architects such as Roger Taillibert, Michel Marot, Georges Candilis, and Jean Frottier. Upon his return to Iran in the late 60's, he was invited by the then president of the University of Tehran, Fazlollah Reza, for lectureship in architecture. He was founder and CEO of Farmoum Consulting Engineers and serves as a professor in various universities in Iran. He is the author of numerous articles and books on architecture and arts, has several designs awards and recognitions, and is known among the influential postmodern architects.

Partial list of projects
 Residential complexes in Villejuif, France
 Sun Tower apartment building in Nice, France
 Chateau Périgord apartment building in Nice, France
 Sports Stadium in Limoge, France
 Parc des Princes stadium, in Paris, France
 Buildings in Arras, France
 Industrial and cinematographic centre, St Germain En Laye
 Health centre affiliated with the University of Paris, faculty of Medicine
 Villefranche and Marina Bais des Anges leisure ports
 St Denis institution in Reunion Island
 Indoor swimming pool of Casino Deauville, France
 Centre for training paralysed children in Montroda, France
 Centre for development of mind and body in Font Romeu, France
 Campus les Violettes near Chateau Amboise (winner of the smallest building with highest efficiency)
 Designer and chief supervisor of RER, the commuter rail in Paris, France

References
Iran Architectural Pride Worthies Foundation website : http://ammi.ir/اعضای-انجمن/سیاوش-تیموری/
Psychology of Colors and Architectural Façade and Interior Color Selection line 3 : http://www.ajbasweb.com/ajbas/2011/December-2011/215-219.pdf
Database for international architecture:  https://www.archinform.net/stich/832.htm
 Parc des Princes;  A hunting forest, a cycle track, hooligans and PSG’s search for identity: https://www.theblizzard.co.uk/article/parc-des-princes

1937 births
École des Beaux-Arts alumni
Iranian architects
Iranian expatriates in France
Living people
University of Tehran alumni
Academic staff of the University of Tehran
Artists from Tehran